Jane P. Kelley is a Democratic former member of the New Hampshire House of Representatives, representing the Rockingham 15th District starting in 1998.

External links
New Hampshire House of Representatives - Jane Kelley official NH House website

Follow the Money - Jane Kelley
2006 2004 2002 2000 1998 campaign contributions

Members of the New Hampshire House of Representatives
Living people
Women state legislators in New Hampshire
Year of birth missing (living people)
21st-century American women